The Plaza of Our Lady of the Pillar (in Spanish: Plaza de Nuestra Señora del Pilar or simply Plaza del Pilar) is one of the busiest popular places in Zaragoza, Spain. In it is the Cathedral-Basilica of Our Lady of the Pillar, where the homonymous Marian invocation is venerated. It is known by the nickname of "El salón de la ciudad" (in English: the hall of the city), since many public parties are held there. It is also called Plaza de las Catedrales (in English: Plaza of the Cathedrals), because it has the two cathedrals of Zaragoza: the Seo and the Pilar.

In this plaza are, in addition to the Basilica del Pilar, buildings such as the city hall, the Fountain of Hispanicity, the Cathedral of El Salvador (La Seo), some court buildings and a monument to Goya.

References

Plazas in Spain
Zaragoza